The Provincial Deputation of Barcelona (Catalan: Diputació Provincial de Barcelona; Spanish: Diputación Provincial de Barcelona) is the local body charged with the government and administration of the province of Barcelona, Spain.

Being the biggest provincial deputation in Spain, it is the third biggest public institution in Catalonia after the Generalitat and the Barcelona City Council, managing a yearly budget around €1,000 m. As is the case for all provincial councils, the Council is indirectly elected, based on the results of the municipal elections in the province. The president is elected among the Council's members meet for the inaugural session after the municipal elections.

The Council's headquarters is the Casa Serra, at the Rambla de Catalunya.

Presidents

References 

Politics of the province of Barcelona
Barcelona